Nicoya Airport  is an airport serving the city of Nicoya in the Guanacaste Province of Costa Rica. The airport is owned and managed by the country's Directorate General of Civil Aviation.

There are nearby hills south and west of the runway.

Passenger Statistics
Although Nicoya Airport serves the main city in the Nicoya Peninsula, there are no scheduled domestic or international service to the airport.

These data show number of passengers movements into the airport, according to the Directorate General of Civil Aviation of Costa Rica's Statistical Yearbooks.

See also

Transport in Costa Rica
List of airports in Costa Rica

References

External links
OpenStreetMap - Nicoya
OurAirports - Nicoya Guanacaste Airport

Airports in Costa Rica
Buildings and structures in Guanacaste Province